The 2022 PDC Development Tour consists of 24 darts tournaments on the 2022 PDC Pro Tour.

Prize money 
The prize money for the PDC Development Tour remained the same from 2021, with each event having a prize fund of £10,000.

This is how the prize money is divided:

February

Development Tour 1 
Development Tour 1 was contested on Friday 18 February 2022 at the Robin Park Sports Centre in Wigan.

Development Tour 2 
Development Tour 2 was contested on Friday 18 February 2022 at the Robin Park Sports Centre in Wigan.

Development Tour 3 
Development Tour 3 was contested on Saturday 19 February 2022 at the Robin Park Sports Centre in Wigan.

Development Tour 4 
Development Tour 4 was contested on Saturday 19 February 2022 at the Robin Park Sports Centre in Wigan.

Development Tour 5 
Development Tour 5 was contested on Sunday 20 February 2022 at the Robin Park Sports Centre in Wigan.

May

Development Tour 6 
Development Tour 6 was contested on Friday 6 May 2022 at the Robin Park Sports Centre in Wigan.

Development Tour 7 
Development Tour 7 was contested on Friday 6 May 2022 at the Robin Park Sports Centre in Wigan.

Development Tour 8 
Development Tour 8 was contested on Saturday 7 May 2022 at the Robin Park Sports Centre in Wigan.

Development Tour 9 
Development Tour 9 was contested on Saturday 7 May 2022 at the Robin Park Sports Centre in Wigan.

Development Tour 10 
Development Tour 10 was contested on Sunday 8 May 2022 at the Robin Park Sports Centre in Wigan. Kevin Doets hit a nine-dart finish against Wesley Veenstra.

June

Development Tour 11 
Development Tour 11 was contested on Friday 3 June 2022 at the Halle 39 in Hildesheim.

Development Tour 12 
Development Tour 12 was contested on Friday 3 June 2022 at the Halle 39 in Hildesheim.

Development Tour 13 
Development Tour 13 was contested on Saturday 4 June 2022 at the Halle 39 in Hildesheim.

Development Tour 14 
Development Tour 14 was contested on Saturday 4 June 2022 at the Halle 39 in Hildesheim.  hit a nine-dart finish against Mark Tabak.

Development Tour 15 
Development Tour 15 was contested on Sunday 5 June 2022 at the Halle 39 in Hildesheim.

August

Development Tour 16 
Development Tour 16 was contested on Friday 19 August 2022 at the Halle 39 in Hildesheim.

Development Tour 17 
Development Tour 17 was contested on Friday 19 August 2022 at the Halle 39 in Hildesheim.

Development Tour 18 
Development Tour 18 was contested on Saturday 20 August 2022 at the Halle 39 in Hildesheim.

Development Tour 19 
Development Tour 19 was contested on Saturday 20 August 2022 at the Halle 39 in Hildesheim.

Development Tour 20 
Development Tour 20 is to be contested on Sunday 21 August 2022 at the Halle 39 in Hildesheim.

October

Development Tour 21 
Development Tour 21 was contested on Friday 7 October 2022 at the Robin Park Sports Centre in Wigan.

Development Tour 22 
Development Tour 22 was contested on Friday 7 October 2022 at the Robin Park Sports Centre in Wigan.

Development Tour 23 
Development Tour 23 was contested on Saturday 8 October 2022 at the Robin Park Sports Centre in Wigan.

Development Tour 24 
Development Tour 24 was contested on Saturday 8 October 2022 at the Robin Park Sports Centre in Wigan.

References 

2022 in darts
2022 PDC Pro Tour